Condola Phylea Rashad (born December 11, 1986) is an American actress best known for her work in the theatre. She first broke out with a critically acclaimed performance in Lynn Nottage's off-Broadway play Ruined (2009), which won a Pulitzer Prize.

Rashad has since received four Tony Award nominations for her work on Broadway in the plays Stick Fly, The Trip to Bountiful, A Doll's House, Part 2, and Saint Joan. She is the youngest performer to have received that many nominations. In addition to these roles, she also received praise for playing Juliet in Romeo and Juliet opposite Orlando Bloom on Broadway. She plays Kate Sacker on the Showtime drama series Billions. She appeared opposite Chiwetel Ejiofor in Come Sunday (2018). She played Joan of Arc in the 2018 Broadway revival of George Bernard Shaw's play Saint Joan.

Early life 

Rashad was born in New York on December 11, 1986, to actress Phylicia Rashad and sportscaster Ahmad Rashad, a former professional football player. She graduated from the California Institute of the Arts in 2008.

Career 
In 2009, Rashad received the Theatre World Award for Best Debut Performance in the Off-Broadway production Ruined and was nominated for a Drama Desk Award. In 2012, Rashad was nominated for Tony Award for Best Featured Actress in a Play for her performance in Stick Fly.

Rashad starred as Shelby, the daughter of Queen Latifah's character, in the 2012 Steel Magnolias remake with the same title. (This role had been played by Julia Roberts in the original film.) In 2012, she appeared in a recurring role on the NBC series Smash, and previously guest starred on The Good Wife, Law & Order: Criminal Intent and Submissions Only. Her film credits include Sex and the City 2 and 30 Beats.

In April 2013, she appeared on Broadway as Thelma in the revival of The Trip to Bountiful starring Cicely Tyson; for this performance, she received her second Featured Actress Tony nomination. In May 2013, she was cast as Juliet in the new Broadway production of Shakespeare's Romeo and Juliet.

In 2016, Rashad began starring in the Showtime drama series Billions, and appeared in the film Money Monster directed by Jodie Foster.

In 2018, she starred in the Netflix-produced biographical film Come Sunday, opposite Chiwetel Ejiofor, who played a Pentecostal minister whose thoughts have changed.

Filmography

Stage

Awards and nominations 
 Tony Award
 2012: Tony Award for Best Featured Actress in a Play—Stick Fly (Nominated)
 2013: Tony Award for Best Featured Actress in a Play—The Trip to Bountiful (Nominated)
 2017: Tony Award for Best Featured Actress in a Play—A Doll's House, Part 2 (Nominated)
 2018: Tony Award for Best Actress in a Play—Saint Joan (Nominated)
 Theatre World Award
 2009: Theatre World Award for Best Debut Performance—Ruined
 Drama Desk Award
 2009: Drama Desk Award for Outstanding Featured Actress in a Play—Ruined (Nominated)
 2013: Drama Desk Award for Outstanding Featured Actress in a Play—The Trip to Bountiful (Nominated)
 Drama League Award
 2009: Drama League Award For Distinguished Performance—Ruined (Nominated)
 2013: Drama League Award For Distinguished Performance—Stick Fly (Nominated)
 2018: Drama League Award For Distinguished Performance—Saint Joan (Nominated)

Achievements 
Rashad was placed on BET's "Future 40" list, which is a list of "40 of the most inspiring and innovative vanguards who are redefining what it means to be unapologetically young, gifted & black".

References

External links 
 
 

1986 births
Living people
African-American actresses
American film actresses
American stage actresses
American television actresses
Actresses from New York City
Theatre World Award winners
California Institute of the Arts alumni
21st-century American actresses
21st-century African-American women
21st-century African-American people
20th-century African-American people
20th-century African-American women